An urban township is a designation of a unit of local government in Ohio as prescribed by chapter 504 of the Ohio Revised Code.  Chapter 504 outlines the procedures for an Ohio civil township to adopt limited home rule government. At least 5,000 people are required to reside in unincorporated areas of a township for that township to adopt limited home rule government. If 15,000 or more people live in unincorporated areas of a township, that township may qualify as an urban township under O.R.C. § 504.01(B) or (D).

List of urban townships by population 
All populations are those of the 2010 United States Census.

Other townships include:
 American Township, Allen County, Ohio
 Cambridge Township, Guernsey County, Ohio
 Delaware Township, Delaware County, Ohio
 Perry Township, Columbiana County, Ohio
 Perry Township, Franklin County, Ohio
 Sycamore Township, Hamilton County, Ohio

See also
List of urban townships in Ohio

References

External links
 Ohio's Limited Home Rule Townships (document in PDF format)

Government of Ohio

Urban townships
Ohio culture